The Maastricht Academy of Music, Dutch: Conservatorium Maastricht, located in the city of Maastricht, is one of nine music academies in the Netherlands. The academy is a faculty of the Zuyd University of Applied Sciences (Hogeschool Zuyd in Dutch) for the Bachelor programme and the "Zuid Nederlandse Hogeschool voor Muziek" for the Master programme, in co-operation with the Fontys Academy of Music and Performing Arts. The academy provides advanced vocational training.

The music academy collaborates with the two other art faculties of the Zuyd University: the Maastricht Academy of Dramatic Arts and the Maastricht Academy of Fine Arts and with the Faculty of Arts and Culture of Maastricht University.

Programs and degrees offered

The Maastricht Academy of Music has departments for European classical music, Jazz, Musical composition, and Opera. The academy proposes a 4 years Bachelor's programme (BMus and BMus ed.) and a two years Master's programme (MMus).

From 2009, the Maastricht Academy of Music will offer a joint master's degree with the Maastricht University.

International orientation

The number of foreign students is ca. 65% from more than 45 different countries and many international members of teaching staff. The principal language of education is English and Dutch students may request to take exams in Dutch.

The academy collaborates and has international exchange programmes with leadings music schools in Europe, such as the Hochschule für Musik Köln (Cologne), (Germany); the Royal Conservatory of Brussels, (Belgium); the Universität für Musik und darstellende Kunst Wien; and the Universität für Musik und darstellende Kunst Graz, (Austria).

History
 1962: Founding of the academy.
 1965: New building at Bonnenfantenstraat 15, Maastricht (architect: P.H. Dingemans).
 2001: The academy becomes a faculty of the Zuyd University.
 200?: Creation of the Zuid Nederlandse Hogeschool voor Muziek for the Postgraduate programme in co-operation with the Fontys Conservatorium.
 2009: Start of a joint master's degree with the Maastricht University.

Festivals and competitions

Since 1990, the Conservatorium organizes an annual festival. Themes were:
2005: Korea
2006: Shostakovich and Lutyens
2007: Schubert | Webern

Since 2001, the conservatorium organizes the Music Awards Maastricht, an annual competition, in collaboration with the Rotary International.

Conservatorium Maastricht people

Faculty

Boris Belkin: Violin
Mirel Iancovici: Cello
Michael Kugel: Viola
Arno Piters: Clarinet
Robert HP Platz: Composition
Carlo Marchione: Guitar
Will Sanders: Horn
Avi Schönfeld: Piano
Robert Szreder: Violin
Arjan Tien: Conducting
Axel Everaert: Vocal and opera studies

Alumni

 Marc Clear, singer
 Marcin Dylla, guitarist 
 Margriet Ehlen, composer and conductor
 Turid Karlsen, soprano
 Goran Krivokapić, guitarist
 Marjon Lambriks, soprano
 André Rieu, violinist and conductor
 Will Sanders, horn player
 Glenn Corneille, jazz pianist
 Carmen Monarcha, singer
 David Satian, composer and jazz pianist 
 Carla Maffioletti, singer

References

External links
 Maastricht Academy of Music website
 European Association of Conservatoires (AEC)
 Overview of Professional Music Training System in The Netherlands. European Association of Conservatoires (AEC).
 Opleidingsprofiel, Muziek, Netwerk Muziek, oktober 2002, PDF (Dutch)
 Conservatories in Transition, October 2004.
 The Nederlands-Vlaamse Accreditatie Organisatie (NVAO)
 HBO-raad

 
Music schools in the Netherlands
Education in Maastricht
Zuyd University of Applied Sciences
1962 establishments in the Netherlands